Baseline is a public transit station directly across from the main campus of Algonquin College in Ottawa's west end, near the intersection of Woodroffe Avenue and Baseline Road. Many Algonquin College students and Centrepointe residents use this station to get to various points in the city, and to and from the college. Several residential and business areas such as Centrepointe and College Square are also served by this station.

It is also a major transfer point for communities in the inner southwest part of Ottawa, making it one of the busiest stations. A small park and ride is also located here, which was the terminus for route 95 for many years until it was extended to Barrhaven. After this station, Route 74 and 75 buses leave the Transitway to travel on reserved bus lanes on Woodroffe Avenue, and re-enter the Transitway at the Nepean Sportsplex. Baseline Station was the first station to be constructed in 1983 when the Transitway was undergoing initial construction.

Expansion

Baseline station has undergone a series of renovations, as part of the expansion of the Southwest Transitway, expansion of Algonquin College and future proofing for the expansion of the Confederation Line. The current station involved the construction of a temporary station west of the original station, making room for the new Algonquin Centre for Construction Excellence (ACCE). The ultimate concept for the updated BRT station loop south of the LRT station will allow passengers to transfer from buses when the Line 1 extension is completed in 2025.

Phase 1A (May 2009 – August 2011)
 Relocated the station west to permit the construction of the now operational Algonquin Centre for Construction Excellence (ACCE) and constructed new connections with Woodroffe Avenue (completed)
 Constructed an underpass beneath Navaho Drive, west of Woodroffe Avenue (completed)
 Construct an underpass beneath College Avenue, west of Woodroffe Avenue (completed?)
 Relocate the 1 200 mm-diameter water main at Navaho Drive (completed?)
 Constructed a tunnel underneath the footprint of Baseline station and ACCE, between Navaho Drive and College Avenue, with the dimensions conducive for either an underground BRT station or an underground LRT station, including necessary sewer work (completed)
 Constructed the Woodroffe Avenue Pedestrian Bridge between the existing Algonquin College's existing B Building on the east side of Woodroffe Avenue with the now open ACCE on the west side of Woodroffe Avenue (completed)

Phase 1B (April 2010 – November 2010)
 Construct an underpass beneath Tallwood Drive, west of Woodroffe Avenue (effectively scrapped, subject to the results of the Environmental Assessment Study for a Line 1 Extension to Barrhaven, due in mid- to late 2020)
 Construct the new Tallwood station at the site of the above mentioned underpass (effectively scrapped, subject to the results of the Environmental Assessment Study for a Line 1 Extension to Barrhaven, due in mid- to late 2020)
 Relocate the storm sewers and water mains along Tallwood Drive (effectively scrapped, subject to the results of the Environmental Assessment Study for a Line 1 Extension to Barrhaven, due in mid- to late 2020)

Phase 2 (2011–2013)
 Construct a new Baseline station at the College Avenue under pass south of ACCE (scrapped in favour of Stage 3 LRT expansion plans)
Extend the grade separated southwest Transitway from Baseline Road south to Navaho Drive with a bus connection to Woodroffe Avenue at Navaho (completed)
Extend the grade separated southwest Transitway from College Avenue to Norice Street, with ramps providing access to Tallwood station and a bus connection to Woodroffe Avenue at Norice (scrapped in favour of Stage 3 LRT expansion plans)

Light rail expansion and integration (2019–2025)
 Construct the southwest terminus of the Line 1 LRT at Baseline station, which includes the construction infrastructure needed for detouring existing bus traffic and station stops to permit construction, decommissioning the Transitway from approximately Navaho Drive to the underpass at Baseline Road and beyond, aligning the alignment into the tunnel beneath Baseline Station and converting it into exclusive LRT access including gravel, concrete pours, track work, signalling infrastructure, platform and building construction and the installation of the overhead catenary system.
The new Baseline station is expected to see the entire current BRT station footprint be returned to landscaping and pedestrian/cycling infrastructure with a new BRT facility being constructed south of the ACCE and west of the existing park and ride, which will require slight reductions to the vehicular parking capacity on site. The new LRT station will include a centre platform within the tunnel that is accessed via fare gate-secured connections with two surface buildings, one near Navaho Drive and one near College Avenue, the latter of which will directly connect to an upper floor of ACCE via an elevated pedestrian walkway. The rest of the station is expected to include retail space, public washrooms, bus operators' buildings, a bus layup area and a fare-paid transfer zone between busses and trains.
There are provisions allowing Baseline station to include storage tracks to accommodate train sets not in revenue service, allowing storage of trains during midday outside of peak for inclusion in the PM peak period or for event service.

Service

The following routes currently serve Baseline:

References

External links

Algonquin College
2009 establishments in Ontario
Railway stations scheduled to open in 2026
Transitway (Ottawa) stations